The 2020–21 FK Jablonec season is the club's 76th season in existence and its 27th consecutive season in the top flight of Czech football. In addition to the domestic league, Jablonec participated in this season's edition of the Czech Cup and the UEFA Europa League. The season covers the period from 1 July 2020 to 30 June 2021.

Players

First-team squad
.

Pre-season and friendlies

Competitions

Overview

Czech First League

League table

Results summary

Results by round

Regular stage

UEFA Europa League

Czech Cup

Statistics

Goalscorers

References

External links

FK Jablonec seasons
Jablonec
Jablonec
2021–22 UEFA Europa Conference League participants seasons